The Derg (also spelled Dergue;), officially the Provisional Military Administrative Council (PMAC), was the military junta that ruled Ethiopia, then including present-day Eritrea, from 1974 to 1987, when the military leadership formally "civilianized" the administration but stayed in power until 1991. 

The Derg was established in June 1974 as the Coordinating Committee of the Armed Forces, Police and Territorial Army, by officers of the Ethiopian Army and Police led initially by chairman Mengistu Haile Mariam. On 12 September 1974, the Derg overthrew the government of the Ethiopian Empire and Emperor Haile Selassie during nationwide mass protests, and three days later formally renamed itself the Provisional Military Administrative Council. In March 1975 the Derg abolished the monarchy and established Ethiopia as a Marxist-Leninist state with itself as the vanguard party in a provisional government. The abolition of feudalism, increased literacy, nationalization, and sweeping land reform including the resettlement and villagization from the Ethiopian Highlands became priorities. Mengistu became chairman in 1977, launching the Red Terror (Qey Shibir) political repression campaign to eliminate political opponents, with tens of thousands imprisoned and executed without trial.

By the mid-1980s, Ethiopia was plagued by multiple issues, such as droughts, economic decline and increasing reliance on foreign aid, recovering from the Ogaden War, and the 1983–1985 famine from which the Derg itself estimated more than a million deaths during its time in power. Conflicts between the Derg and various ethnic militias saw a gradual resurgence, particularly the Ethiopian Civil War and the Eritrean War of Independence. Mengistu abolished the Derg in 1987 and formed the People's Democratic Republic of Ethiopia led by the Workers' Party of Ethiopia, with a new government containing civilians but still dominated by members of the Derg.

History

Formation and growth

After the Ethiopian Revolution in February 1974, the first signal of any mass uprisings was the actions of the soldiers of the 4th Brigade of the 4th Army Division in Nagelle in southern Ethiopia. They were mainly unhappy about the lack of food and water and then arrested their brigade commander and other officers and kept them incarcerated. When the government sent the commander of the ground forces, General Deresse Dubala, to negotiate with the rebels, they held him and forced him to eat their food and drink their water. Similar mutinies took place at the Ethiopian Air Force base at Bishoftu on 12 February, and at Second Division at Asmara on 25 February. It was these protests that gave rise to a general uprising of the armed forces.

The Coordinating Committee of the Armed Forces, Police and Territorial Army, known as the Derg, was officially announced on 28 June 1974 by a group of military officers. This was done under the pretext of maintaining law and order, due to the powerlessness of the civilian government following widespread mutiny in the armed forces of Ethiopia earlier that year. Its members were not directly involved in those mutinies nor was this the first military committee organized to support the administration of Prime Minister Endelkachew Makonnen. Alem Zewde Tessema had established the armed forces coordinated committee on 23 March. Over the following months, radicals in the Ethiopian military came to believe Makonnen was acting on behalf of the hated feudal aristocracy. When a group of notables petitioned for the release of a number of government ministers and officials who were under arrest for corruption and other crimes, three days later the Derg was announced.

The Derg, which originally consisted of soldiers at the capital, broadened its membership by including representatives from the 40 units of the Ethiopian Army, Air Force, Navy, Kebur Zabagna (Imperial Guard), Territorial Army and police: each unit was expected to send three representatives, who were supposed to be privates, NCOs and junior officers up to the rank of major. According to Bahru Zewde, "Senior officers were deemed too compromised by close association to the regime." The Derg was reported to have consisted of 120 soldiers, a statement which has gained wide acceptance due to the habitual secretiveness of the Derg in its early years. But, Bahru Zewde notes that "in actual fact, their number was less than 110", and Aregawi Berhe mentions two different sources which record 109 persons as being members of the Derg. No new members were ever admitted, and the number decreased, especially in the first few years, as some members were expelled or killed. 

The Derg first assembled at the Fourth Division headquarters, and elected Major Mengistu Haile Mariam as its chairman and Major Atnafu Abate as vice-chairman. Their stated mission was to study and address the grievances of various military units, investigate abuses by senior officers and staff and root out corruption in the military. In July, the Derg obtained key concessions from emperor, Haile Selassie, which included the power to arrest not only military officers but government officials at every level. Soon both former Prime Ministers Aklilu Habte-Wold and Endelkachew Makonnen, along with most of their cabinets, most regional governors, many senior military officers and officials of the Imperial court were imprisoned. In August, after a proposed constitution creating a constitutional monarchy was presented to the emperor, the Derg began a program of dismantling the imperial government to forestall further developments in that direction. The Derg deposed and imprisoned the emperor on 12 September 1974.

On 15 September, the committee renamed itself the Provisional Military Administrative Council (PMAC) and took full control of the government and all facilities within the government. The Derg chose Lieutenant General Aman Andom, a popular military leader and a Sandhurst graduate, to be its chairman and acting head-of-state. This was pending the return of Crown Prince Asfaw Wossen from medical treatment in Europe when he would assume the throne as a constitutional monarch. However, General Aman Andom quarreled with the radical elements in the Derg over the issue of a new military offensive in Eritrea and their proposal to execute the high officials of Selassie's former government. After eliminating units loyal to him—the Engineers, the Imperial Bodyguard and the Air Force—the Derg removed General Aman from power and executed him on 23 November 1974, along with some of his supporters and 60 officials of the previous Imperial government.

Brigadier General Tafari Benti became the new Chairman of the Derg and the head of state, with Mengistu and Atnafu Abate as his two vice-chairmen, both with promotions to the rank of Lieutenant-Colonel. The monarchy was formally abolished in March 1975, and Marxism-Leninism was proclaimed the new ideology of the state. Emperor Haile Selassie died under mysterious circumstances on 27 August 1975 while his personal physician was absent. It is commonly believed that Mengistu killed him, either by ordering it done or by his own hand although the former is considered more likely. Both Derg and Haile Selassie government relocated numerous Amharas into southern Ethiopia, including present-day of the Oromia region, where they served in government administration, courts, church and school, where Oromo texts were eliminated and replaced by Amharic. The Abyssinian elites perceived the Oromo identity and languages as hindrances to Ethiopian national identity expansion.

Under Mengistu's leadership

After internal conflicts that resulted in the execution of General Tafari Benti and several of his supporters in February 1977, and the execution of Colonel Atnafu Abate in November 1977, Mengistu gained undisputed leadership of the Derg. In 1987, he formally dissolved the Derg and established the country as the People's Democratic Republic of Ethiopia (PDRE) under a new constitution.

Many of the Derg members remained in key government posts and also served as the members of the Central Committee and the Politburo of the Workers' Party of Ethiopia (WPE). This became Ethiopia's civilian version of the Eastern bloc communist parties. Mengistu became Secretary-General of the WPE and President of the PDRE while remaining the Commander in Chief of the Armed Forces.

Ethiopian Civil War

Opposition to the reign of the Derg was the main cause of the Ethiopian Civil War. This conflict began as extralegal violence between 1975 and 1977, known as the Red Terror, when the Derg struggled for authority, first with various opposition groups within the country, then with a variety of groups jockeying for the role of vanguard party. Though human rights violations were committed by all sides, the great majority of abuses against civilians as well as actions leading to devastating famine were committed by the government.

The Ethiopian Orthodox Church, which represents the Christian state church of Ethiopia for centuries, was disestablished in 1974. The Derg declared a policy of state atheism, a tenet of Marxism-Leninist ideology; this was opposed by the vast majority of the Ethiopian population.

Once the Derg had gained victory over these groups and successfully fought off an invasion from Somalia in 1977, it engaged in a brutal war against armed opponents within the country. These grouped ranged from the conservative and pro-monarchy Ethiopian Democratic Union to the far-leftist Ethiopian People's Revolutionary Party. Other groups included Eritrean People's Liberation Front (EPLF) guerrillas fighting for Eritrean independence, rebels based in Tigray (which included the nascent Tigray People's Liberation Front) and other groups. Under the Derg, Ethiopia became the Soviet bloc's closest ally in Africa and became one of the best-armed nation of the region as a result of massive military aid, chiefly from the Soviet Union, East Germany, Cuba and North Korea.

On 4 March 1975, the Derg announced a program of land reform, according to its main slogan of "Land to the Tiller", which was unequivocally radical, even in Soviet and Chinese terms. It nationalized all rural land, abolished tenancy and put peasants in charge of enforcing the whole scheme. Although Derg gained little respect during its rule, this reform resulted in a rare show of support for the junta, as Marina and David Ottaway describe:
During a massive demonstration in Addis Ababa immediately following the announcement, a group of students broke through police and army barriers, climbed the wall and escarpment around Menelik Palace, and embraced Mengistu as the hero of the reform.In addition, the Derg in 1975 nationalized most industries and private and somewhat secured urban real-estate holdings.

Mismanagement, corruption and general opposition to the Derg's dictatorial and violent communist rule, coupled with the draining effects of constant warfare with the separatist guerrilla movements in Eritrea and Tigray, led to a drastic fall in general productivity of food and cash crops. In October 1978, the Derg announced the National Revolutionary Development Campaign to mobilize human and material resources to transform the economy, which led to a ten-year plan (1984/85 - 1993/94) to expand agricultural and industrial output, forecasting a 6.5% growth in GDP and a 3.6% rise in per capita income. Instead, per capita income declined considerably to 0.8% over this period.

1983–85 famine

Famine scholar Alex de Waal observed that while the famine that struck the country in the mid-1980s is usually ascribed to drought, closer investigation shows that widespread drought occurred only some months after the famine was already underway. Hundreds of thousands fled economic misery, conscription and political repression and went to live in neighbouring countries and all over the Western world, creating, for the first time, an Ethiopian diaspora.

Aid and controversy

The 1984–1985 Tigray famine brought the political situation in Ethiopia to the attention of the world and inspired charitable drives in Western nations, notably by Oxfam and the Live Aid concerts of July 1985. The money they raised was distributed among NGOs working in Ethiopia. A controversy arose when it was found that some of these NGOs were under Derg control or influence and that some Oxfam and Live Aid money had been used to fund Derg's enforced resettlement programmes, under which they displaced millions of people and killed between 50,000 and 100,000. A BBC investigation reported that Tigray People's Liberation Front rebels had used millions of dollars of aid money to buy arms; these accusations were later fully retracted by the corporation.

Dissolution and trials

Although the Derg government came to an end on 22 February 1987, three weeks after a referendum approved the constitution for the PDRE, it was not until September that the new government was fully in place and the Derg formally abolished. The surviving members of the Derg, including Mengistu, remained in power as the leaders of the new civilian regime.

The geopolitical situation became unfavourable for the communist government in the late 1980s, with the Soviet Union retreating from the expansion of Communism under Mikhail Gorbachev's glasnost and perestroika. Socialist bloc countries drastically reduced their aid to Ethiopia and were struggling to keep their own economies going. This resulted in even more economic hardship, and the military gave way in the face of determined onslaughts by guerrilla forces in the north. The Soviet Union stopped aiding the PDRE altogether in December 1990. Together with the fall of Communism in the Eastern Bloc in the Revolutions of 1989, this itself dealt a serious blow to the PDRE.

Towards the end of January 1991, a coalition of rebel forces, the Ethiopian People's Revolutionary Democratic Front (EPRDF) captured Gondar (the ancient capital city), Bahir Dar and Dessie. Meanwhile, the Eritrean People's Liberation Front had gained control of all of Eritrea except for Asmara and Assab in the south. The Soviet Union, mired in its internal turmoil, could no longer prop up the Derg. In the words of the former US diplomat Paul B. Henze, "As his doom became imminent, Mengistu alternated between vowing resistance to the end and hinting that he might follow Emperor Tewodros II's example and commit suicide." His actions were frantic: he convened the Shengo, for an emergency session and reorganized his cabinet, but as Henze concludes, "these shifts came too late to be effective." On 21 May, claiming that he was going to inspect troops at a base in southern Ethiopia, Mengistu slipped out of the country into Kenya. From there, he flew along with his immediate family to Zimbabwe, where he was granted asylum and where he still resides. 
  
Mengistu was sentenced to death in 2008 in absentia, charged with genocide, homicide, illegal imprisonment and property seizures. In 2009, Zimbabwe’s late former Information Minister, Tichaona Jokonya, in an interview with Voice of America said Harare was not going to extradite Mengistu. 
In August 2018, Ethiopian former Prime Minister Hailemariam Desalegn while heading an African Union election observer mission in Harare met with Mengistu, and shared their photo on Facebook, which was quickly deleted as it proved so controversial and generally unpopular. It is thought that Prime Minister Abiy Ahmed, who had at that time released thousands of political prisoners, had approved the visit possibly because some opposition groups had used Mengistu's image to voice their disapproval of Abiy's policies.
In May 2022, Zimbabwe's Foreign Affairs Minister Ambassador Frederick Shava gave a clear sign that Harare would be prepared to extradite Mengistu in a reversal of Jokonya's policy. Given the turmoil in Ethiopia with the Tigray conflict, there have been no further apparent developments.

Upon entering Addis Ababa, the EPRDF immediately disbanded the WPE and arrested almost all of the prominent Derg officials shortly after. In December 2006, seventy-three officials of the Derg were found guilty of genocide. Thirty-four people were in court, fourteen others had died during the lengthy process, and twenty-five, including Mengistu, were tried in absentia. The trial ended 26 May 2008, and many of the officials were sentenced to death. In December 2010, the Ethiopian government commuted the death sentence of 23 Derg officials. On 4 October 2011, 16 former Derg officials were freed after twenty years of incarceration. The Ethiopian government paroled almost all of the Derg officials who had been imprisoned for 20 years. Other Derg ex-officials managed to escape and organized rebel groups to overthrow Ethiopia's new government. One of these groups is the Ethiopian Unity Patriots Front which waged an insurgency in the Gambela Region from 1993 to 2012.

At the conclusion of a trial lasting from 1994 to 2006, Mengistu was convicted of genocide, war crimes and crimes against humanity and sentenced in absentia to death by an Ethiopian court for his role in Ethiopia's Red Terror. The Ethiopian legal definition is distinct from the legal definition as outlined in the Genocide Convention by the United Nations and other definitions in that it defines genocide as intent to wipe out political and not just ethnic groups. In this respect, it closely resembles the definition of politicide outlined by Barbara Harff, who wrote in 1992 that no Communist country or governing body had been convicted of genocide.

Chairmen
 Aman Mikael Andom (15 September 1974 – 17 November 1974)
 Mengistu Haile Mariam (17 November 1974 – 28 November 1974) (1st term)
 Tafari Benti (28 November 1974 – 3 February 1977)
 Mengistu Haile Mariam (3 February 1977 – 10 September 1987) (2nd term, acting to 11 February 1977)

Military

The Derg army had significant role in the government and enforcing law since the establishment. By 1976, the Soviet and Derg relations strengthened with the Soviet aided the Derg military with arms. Together with the Cuban soldiers, the military gained support against Somali Democratic Republic during the Ogaden War. According to the United States State Department report in May 1977, 50 Cuban advisors trained Ethiopian troops to combat, while another report in July stated that 3,000 Cubans were in Ethiopia with one Eritrean Liberation Front officer there. 

By the fall of the Derg, the army of the Derg were only 45,000 troops which disintegrated shortly afterwards.

PMAC Standing Committee (January 1985)
 Chairman
 Mengistu Haile Mariam
 Secretary-General
 Lt.-Col. Fikre Selassie Wogderess
 Deputy Secretary-General
 Col Fisseha Desta
 Military Affairs
 Lt.-Gen. Tesfaye Gebre Kidan
 Security
 Tekla Tulu
 Development and Planning
 Addis Tedla
 Party Organization
 Legesse Asfaw
 Administrative and Legal Affairs
 Wubshet Dessie
 Other members
 Genesse Wolde-Kidan
 Endale Tessema
 Kassahun Tafesse
 Birhanu Bayeh

See also

 History of Ethiopia
 Vice President of Ethiopia

Notes

References
 Bahru Zewde. 2001. A History of Modern Ethiopia (second edition). London: James Currey.
 Henze, Paul. 2000. Layers of Time: A History of Ethiopia. New York: Palgrave. 
 Ottway, Marina & David. 1978. Ethiopia: Empire in Revolution. New York: Africana

External links
ETHIOPIA – A Country Study (at the Library of Congress)
The Ethiopian Revolution, The Dergue, Civil War and Famine, Ethiopian Treasures
 "Mengistu found guilty of genocide", BBC News
The Economic Policies of Socialist Ethiopia

Derg
Communism in Ethiopia
Communism in Eritrea
Factions of the Ethiopian Civil War
Government of Ethiopia
20th century in Ethiopia
20th century in Eritrea
1974 establishments in Ethiopia
Military dictatorships
Communist states
Atheist states
1987 disestablishments in Africa
1980s disestablishments in Ethiopia
States and territories established in 1974
States and territories disestablished in 1987
Totalitarian states
Former socialist republics
Provisional governments